Patrik Elmander (born 26 November 1978) is a Swedish football player.

Born in Alingsås, Sweden, he is the oldest of the Elmander brothers. His two younger brothers are Johan Elmander and Peter Elmander. He started his youth career at Holmalunds IF. During his career, he has played for Örgryte IS, Kalmar FF, Raufoss (Norway), Gais and Jönköping Södra IF. In 2004, Elmander had the opportunity to play alongside his younger brother Peter during his stay with GAIS.

References

External links
OIS official website 
 (archive)

1978 births
Living people
Swedish footballers
Allsvenskan players
Örgryte IS players
GAIS players
Jönköpings Södra IF players
Association football forwards
People from Alingsås